Abraham Burton Cohen (March 9, 1882 – February 11, 1956) was an American civil engineer notable for his role in designing innovative and record-breaking concrete bridges such as the Delaware, Lackawanna and Western Railroad's Tunkhannock Viaduct, the world's largest concrete structure when completed. Cohen was an active member of the American Concrete Institute and earned ACI's Wason Medal for Most Meritorious Paper in 1927.

Biography
Cohen was Jewish, born in Chicago and died in East Orange, New Jersey. He earned a degree in civil engineering from Purdue University in 1905 and an honorary doctorate in 1949. Cohen spent a majority of his career with the Delaware, Lackawanna and Western Railroad (DL&W) before leaving in 1920 to form his own consulting practice in New York City. As a consulting engineer, he designed a number of concrete spans in Scranton, Pennsylvania, Binghamton, New York, and elsewhere. At least two of his works, the Tunkhannock Viaduct and Scranton's Harrison Avenue Bridge, are on the National Register of Historic Places. He died on February 11, 1956.

Selected projects
 1908 Delaware River Viaduct on DL&W Lackawanna Cut-Off
 1909 Paulinskill Viaduct on DL&W Lackawanna Cut-Off
 1913 Tunkhannock Viaduct on DL&W Clarks Summit-Hallstead Cutoff
 1916 DL&W track elevation in Orange and South Orange, New Jersey
 1921 Harrison Avenue Bridge in Scranton, Pennsylvania
 1924 Hudson County Boulevard at Journal Square, Jersey City, New Jersey
 1946 Spruce Street Bridge repairs in Scranton, Pennsylvania

Bibliography

References

External links

1882 births
1956 deaths
American bridge engineers
Concrete pioneers
Purdue University College of Engineering alumni
Lackawanna Cut-Off
People from East Orange, New Jersey
People from Chicago
Delaware, Lackawanna and Western Railroad
Engineers from Illinois
Engineers from New Jersey